The Snow Lion (sometimes spelled snowlion;) is a celestial animal of Tibet. It is the emblem of Tibet, representing the snowy mountain ranges and glaciers of Tibet, and may also symbolize power and strength, and fearlessness and joy, east and the earth element. It is one of the Four Dignities. It ranges over the mountains, and is commonly pictured as being white with a turquoise mane. In Journey to the West published in 1592, Snow Lion is depicted as one of Yōkais.

As national emblem of Tibet

From 1909 until 1959, a single snow lion or a pair of them was used as the national emblem of Tibet on coins, postage stamps, banknotes and the national flag of Tibet. The version shown on right with two Snow Lions was introduced by the 13th Dalai Lama in 1912 based on old military banners, and is still used by the Government of Tibet in Exile. The flag is popularly known as the Snow Lion Flag (gangs seng dar cha).

In Tibetan culture

Snow lion is frequently mentioned in Tibetan folk songs and proverbs. It is thought to live in the highest mountains as it is the "king of beasts" that would tower over other animals of the lower levels. Snow lions may also represent hermits and yogis who live high up in the mountains. Marpa was called to interpret the meaning when, "Tibet's great yogin, Milarepa, once had a prophetic dream which included a snow lion."

Snow Lioness milk
In Tibetan lore, two Tibetan culture heroes, Gesar and Milarepa, were said to have been raised by snow lioness. The milk of the Snow Lioness (Tibetan: Gangs Sengemo) is reputed to contain special nutrients to heal the body and restore it to harmony. Some holy medicinal remedies are believed to contain the essence of Snow Lioness milk. Her milk is also used to symbolise the Dharma and its purity, as Milarepa replies to a man seeking to buy the Dharma from him with expensive gifts:

"I, the snow lioness who stays in snowy solitudes, 
Have milk which is like the essential nectar. 
In the absence of golden cups, 
I would not pour it in an ordinary vessel." 
Legend has it that the lioness produces milk from its paws, and the milk may pass into hollow balls given to the lioness to play with. This ball may be represented in Tibetan art as a three-coloured "wheel of joy" (dga' 'khyil).

Snow Lion dance

The name seng ge and its related forms come from Sanskrit siṅha, and cham or garcham is a Buddhist ritual dance. The snow lion dance may be performed as a secular dance, or as a ritual dance performed by bon po monks. This dance may also be found among people in other Himalayan regions such as the Monpa people in Arunachal Pradesh, and in Sikkim where it is called Singhi Chham.

In Buddhist art

The lion was adopted as a symbol of Shakyamuni Buddha in early Buddhism; it is also depicted as a vehicle for a number of Vajrayana deities such as Vaishravana and Manjushri, and the lion throne may be found in many nirmanakaya Buddha forms. The lion in India art is represented in Tibetan Buddhist art as the Snow Lion. The Snow Lion is the protector of Buddha and in paintings and sculpture is usually seen as holding up the Buddha's throne (one on the left and one on the right of the throne.) The throne of a Buddha may also be depicted with eight Snow Lions representing the 8 main Bodhisattvas of Buddha Shakyamuni.

The body of the Snow Lion is white while its flowing hair of mane, tail and curls on legs, is either blue or green. While most Snow Lions are gender neutral in Buddhist art there are some that are represented as obviously male and some as obviously female. When represented as a symmetrical pair the male is on the left and the female on the right. Sculptural Snow Lions are often in repousse metal that has been gilt and painted.

Attributes

The Snow Lion is a tulku or personification of the primordial playfulness of ananda "joy, bliss", comparable to the western unicorn. Though paradoxical, the Snow Lion does not fly but their feet never touch the ground; their existence is a playful continuum of leaping from mountain peak to mountain peak. The energetic potency (wisdom or shakti) of the Snow Lion is expressed in the attribute of the gankyil or "ananda-wheel" the Snow Lion keep in eternal play. The gankyil is the principal polyvalent symbol and teaching tool of all the doctrinal trinities of Dzogchen and is the energetic signature of the trikaya. The gankyil is the inner wheel of the Dharmacakra of the Ashtamangala path of Vajrayana Buddhism.

Roar
The roar of the Snow Lion embodies the sound of 'emptiness' (Sanskrit: Śūnyatā), courage and truth, and because of this is often a synonym for the Buddhadharma, the Buddha’s teachings, as it implies freedom from karma and the challenging call to awakening. It was considered to be so powerful that just a single roar could cause seven dragons to fall from the sky.

Tibetan Lion Dog
The Shih Tzu, Lhasa Apso and Tibetan Terrier are also called the Lion Dog which may be due to their resemblance to the Snow Lion. However it is unknown whether the dogs were bred to resemble the Snow Lion or if the artistic depiction of the Snow Lion was influenced by the features of the dogs.

See also
 
Albino lion
Asiatic lion
Ashtamangala
Chinese guardian lions
Pallas's cat
Qilin
Tibetan Terrier (breed of dog)
Snow leopard
Tibet
Tibetan Buddhism

References

External links

Symbols of Tibetan Buddhism
Tibetan Government in Exile webpage for what they call the "Tibetan National Flag"

Tibetan Buddhist practices
Tibetan culture
Tantric practices
Tibetan Buddhist mythology
Tibetan legendary creatures
Mythological lions
Lions in heraldry
Chinese heraldry